Achim Richter (born 21 September 1940 in Dresden) is a German nuclear physicist. He became a professor at the Institute of Nuclear Physics at the Darmstadt University of Technology in 1974 and retired in September 2008. From 1 November 2008 to 31 October 2012 he was director of the European Centre for Theoretical Studies in Nuclear Physics and Related Areas (ECT*) in Trento, Italy. Since November 1, 2012, he has been professor again at the Institute for Nuclear Physics of TU Darmstadt.

Biography 
Richter was born to builder Georg Edmund Richter and his wife Elsa (née Wenzel). He attended primary and secondary school in Dresden, graduating as dux of the school in 1958, with a university diploma. After his application to study physics at the technical university in Dresden, he was rejected five times on political and ideological grounds, he escaped from East Germany in 1959, via West Berlin.

In 1959 he started studying physics at the University of Heidelberg, and was accepted as a member of the Studienstiftung des deutschen Volkes (Study Foundation of German People) in 1963, two years later he graduated with a degree in physics.  In 1967 he was awarded a doctorate by professor Wolfgang Gentner at the Max-Planck-Institute of Nuclear Physics in Heidelberg.  From 1967 to 1968 he worked as a research associate in the physics department at Florida State University in Tallahassee, Florida. From 1969 to 1970 he worked as a post-doctoral colleague in the physics department of the Argonne National Laboratory in Illinois.

In 1971 Richter became a research associate at the Max-Planck-Institut of nuclear physics. After completing his post-doctoral qualification in physics at the University of Heidelberg he became an associate professor there. From 1971 to 1973 Richter was a scientific advisor and professor at the Ruhr University Bochum. In 1974 he became director of the institute of nuclear physics of the Darmstadt University of Technology.

Richter is a member of the Deutsche Physikalische Gesellschaft (German Physical Society) and of the Deutschen Hochschulverband (German Association of University Professors). At the end of 2005, the American Physical Society elected him as the first non-American to be senior editor of the Reviews of Modern Physics.

Richter has played the viola from childhood. He is married to Christine Monika.

Works 

Richter and his staff members achieved significant research results with the development of the superconducting electron accelerators in Darmstadt S-DALINAC, which was the first accelerator of this kind in Europe, and furthermore the design and setup of the first free electron Laser (FEL) in Germany.

He is regarded as the discoverer of the scissors mode in heavy deformed atomic nuclei in 1984. His scientific working fields cover a broad spectra in the areas of nuclear physics, atomic physics, radiation physics, acceleration physics and nonlinear dynamic systems. 
There are researches about symmetries and conservation laws in light nuclei and phenomena of fluctuations in nuclear reactions, experiments for the electromagnetic suspenses of nuclei with photons, electrons and hadrons as well as works on the area of channeling radiation, non-linear dynamics and quantum chaos.

Honors 

Richter won numerous honors and recognitions: 
 1964: Winner of the University Award for Physics
 1988: Gay-Lussac Humboldt Prize
 1990: Correspondent of the Royal Society of South Africa
 1992: Winner of the Max Planck Research Award
 1995: Honorary doctorate of Chalmers University of Technology in Göteborg, Sweden
 1996: Honorary doctorate of Ghent University, Belgium
 1996: Correspondent of the Heidelberger Academy of Sciences
 2000: Honorary doctorate of University of the Witwatersrand, Johannesburg, South Africa
 2000: Honorary doctorate of Kharkov National University, Ukraine
 2001: Winner of the Stern-Gerlach Medal of German Physical Society
 2002: Fellow of the American Physical Society
 2005: Correspondent of the Royal Society of Arts and Sciences in Göteborg, Sweden
 2006: Gained Tage Erlander Professorship of the Swedish Research Councils
 2007: Gained an Order of Merit of the State of Hessen
 2010: Member of the Royal Physiographic Society in Lund, Sweden
 2010: Member of the German National Academy of Sciences Leopoldina

References

External links 
Homepage of Richter at the TU Darmstadt

1940 births
Living people
20th-century German physicists
Studienstiftung alumni
Florida State University faculty
Academic staff of Technische Universität Darmstadt
Members of the Royal Physiographic Society in Lund
Fellows of the American Physical Society
21st-century German physicists